Eucaterva is a genus of moths in the family Geometridae erected by Augustus Radcliffe Grote in 1882.

Species
 Eucaterva bonniwelli Cassino & Swett, 1922
 Eucaterva variaria Grote, 1882

References

Ourapterygini